"Now I Know" is a song written by Cindy Greene, Don Cook and Chick Rains, and recorded by American country music artist Lari White.  It was released in September 1994 as the second single from the album Wishes.  The song reached number 5 on the Billboard Hot Country Singles & Tracks chart.

Critical reception
A favorable review came from Cash Box magazine, whose reviewer Richard McVey wrote that it "is a song rich lyrically and vocally."

Chart performance

References 

1994 singles
1994 songs
Lari White songs
Songs written by Don Cook
Song recordings produced by Garth Fundis
RCA Records singles
Music videos directed by Steven Goldmann
Songs written by Chick Rains